Ravinder "Ravi" Kahlon (born May 15, 1979) is a Canadian politician and athlete. He is a Member of the Legislative Assembly (MLA) of British Columbia, representing the riding of Delta North since 2017, and member of the British Columbia New Democratic Party (BC NDP). He has served in the cabinet of British Columbia since 2020, currently as Minister of Housing and Government House Leader. As a field hockey player, he has represented Canada at several international events, including the 2000 and 2008 Summer Olympics.

Early life and playing career
Kahlon was born and raised in Victoria, British Columbia; his mother was a restauranteur, while his father was a sawmill worker. He was introduced to field hockey by his family at the age of 7, and began playing as a defender in the Victoria League at age twelve. He graduated from Lambrick Park Secondary School, where he also played basketball. He was selected to the junior national field hockey team in 1999 and was named team captain. Kahlon was a student at Camosun College in Victoria at the time. He earned his first international senior cap for the Men's National Team in 2000 against Malaysia in Brussels.

Eventually competing at every level of international competition, Kahlon's career would include playing three times in Hockey World Cup qualifying tournaments, representing Canada at the 2002 and 2006 Commonwealth Games, a gold medal performance at the 2007 Pan American Games, and tenth-place finishes at the 2000 Summer Olympics in Sydney and 2008 Summer Olympics in Beijing.

He moved to the Metro Vancouver suburb of Delta in 2005 to facilitate his career with the Vancouver-based national field hockey team. After retiring from playing, he began a career in banking, and also served as director of stakeholder relations for the BC NDP caucus. In 2013, Kahlon was inducted into the Delta Sports Hall of Fame.

Political career
In October 2016, Kahlon announced he would be running for office in the 2017 provincial election with the BC NDP; he won the NDP nomination in Delta North. That riding is considered a swing district, having been won three times each by the BC NDP and British Columbia Liberal Party in the six elections prior to 2017. When the election was held on May 9, 2017, Kahlon defeated Liberal incumbent Scott Hamilton by a margin of 9.14 percentage points.

The 2017 British Columbia election resulted in a hung parliament, with no party controlling a majority of seats in the Legislative Assembly. However, the NDP was eventually able to form a minority government with the support of the Green Party of British Columbia. The NDP government was sworn in on July 18, 2017, with new Premier John Horgan naming Kahlon as Parliamentary Secretary for Sport and Multiculturalism. Kahlon was later named Parliamentary Secretary for Forests, Lands, Natural Resource Operations and Rural Development.

Kahlon supported eventual winner Jagmeet Singh for leader of the federal New Democratic Party in that party's 2017 leadership election.

Following his re-election in 2020, in which he won 56.78% of the vote, he was named Minister of Jobs, Economic Recovery and Innovation.

After Horgan announced his retirement as premier and party leader in 2022, Kahlon endorsed David Eby and joined as co-chair of Eby's campaign, alongside Katrina Chen. Kahlon was subsequently named Minister of Housing and Government House Leader in the Eby ministry on December 7, 2022.

Electoral record

International senior competitions
 2000 — Olympic Games, Sydney (10th)
 2001 — World Cup Qualifier, Edinburgh (8th)
 2002 — Commonwealth Games, Manchester (6th)
 2003 — Pan American Games, Santo Domingo (2nd)
 2004 — Olympic Qualifying Tournament, Madrid (11th)
 2004 — Pan American Cup, London (2nd)
 2006 — Commonwealth Games, Melbourne (9th)
 2007 — Pan American Games, Rio de Janeiro (1st)
 2008 — Olympic Games, Beijing (10th)

References

External links

 
 
 
 
 

1979 births
Living people
Canadian male field hockey players
Field hockey players at the 2000 Summer Olympics
Field hockey players at the 2002 Commonwealth Games
Field hockey players at the 2006 Commonwealth Games
Field hockey players at the 2007 Pan American Games
Field hockey players at the 2008 Summer Olympics
Olympic field hockey players of Canada
Politicians from Victoria, British Columbia
Field hockey players from Victoria, British Columbia
People from Delta, British Columbia
Canadian politicians of Punjabi descent
Canadian Sikhs
Canadian sportsperson-politicians
Pan American Games gold medalists for Canada
Pan American Games silver medalists for Canada
Pan American Games medalists in field hockey
Commonwealth Games competitors for Canada
Canadian sportspeople of Indian descent
British Columbia New Democratic Party MLAs
Members of the Executive Council of British Columbia
Canadian politicians of Indian descent
Medalists at the 2003 Pan American Games
Medalists at the 2007 Pan American Games
Camosun College alumni